Christopher Woodrow is an American entrepreneur, financier, and movie producer. He is the founder and chairman at Media Capital Technologies, a specialty finance and asset management company focused on strategic investments in premium content.

Early Life
Woodrow was raised in Ithaca, New York, and graduated from Lansing High School. He attended the University of Alabama from 1995 to 1999, where he was a member of Beta Theta Pi and Jasons Senior Men’s Honorary.

Career

Woodrow was the founder and served as chairman and CEO at Vendian Entertainment and Worldview Entertainment, motion picture companies that financed and produced over 30 feature films. The films, including Fox Searchlight’s Birdman, Warner Bros.’ Black Mass, and Lionsgate’s Hacksaw Ridge, have grossed more than $700 million worldwide, been nominated for 16 Academy Awards, and won six Oscars, including Best Picture. Variety named Woodrow as one of 10 Producers To Watch in 2012, while Deadline named him as one of five Producers To Watch at the Cannes Film Festival in 2013.

Prior to this, he was managing director at Prospect Point Capital, an investment company focused on structured finance and venture capital opportunities in media and entertainment. Woodrow was previously a vice president at Citigroup Global Markets and worked in investment banking at Oppenheimer & Co.

Filmography
He was a producer in all films unless otherwise noted.

Film

Thanks

References

External links
 Media Capital Technologies
 

1977 births
Living people
People from Syracuse, New York
University of Alabama alumni
American entertainment industry businesspeople
American film producers
American financiers
American venture capitalists